The Pro-Choice Action Network (Pro-CAN) is a Canadian abortion rights advocacy group based in Vancouver, British Columbia. Founded in 1987 as the BC Coalition for Abortion Clinics, the group changed to its current name in 1998. It began publishing a quarterly newsletter, The Pro-Choice Press, in 1995. Pro-CAN is the largest and longest-established abortion rights organization in British Columbia. In November 1988, it successfully opened Everywoman's Health Centre. Groups including women's health groups, the labour movement, the United Church, student groups, and health care professionals supported Pro-CAN's initiative to open Everywoman's Health Centre. This opening is of notable importance because at that time, it was illegal for free-standing clinics to offer abortion services. The group stopped its activities in 2009, except for its website, and now refers to the Abortion Rights Coalition of Canada.

Lobbying and advocating
Pro-CAN lobbies and advocates for:
the availability of safe, affordable, and effective contraception, and comprehensive sex education in schools;
the government fully funding all health services relating to reproductive health in community-based clinics and hospitals, inclusive of surgical and medical abortion services;
the defeat of any law that criminalizes abortion or impedes what they say is a woman's individual right to choice and access to abortion services;
protection and enforcement of the Access to Abortion Services Act and women's safe access to abortion services in an atmosphere of dignity and respect;
the principles of the Canada Health Act of May 1998, and
provision for universal access to abortion in all regions of Canada and federal guarantee of their access.

History of abortion in Canada
1869 – abortion is made illegal in Canada. Dissemination about birth control is also made illegal.

1892 – Parliament enacts the first criminal code, which prohibits abortion and the sale, distribution and advertisement of birth contraception

1926 to 1947 – 4,000 to 6,000 Canadian women die as a result of bungled illegal abortions

1969-Parliament passes amendments to section 251 of the Criminal Code allowing some abortions under very restricted conditions and decriminalizing abortion. Some Canadian provinces refuse to provide abortion services and these services were generally unavailable to women living outside of major cities.

1970- The Vancouver Women's Caucus chain themselves to the Parliament Gallery in the House of Commons, closing Canadian Parliament for the first time in Canada's history.

1974-The Canadian Abortion Rights Action League is founded and becomes the first national group to promote abortion rights in Canada.

1987- The BC Coalition for Abortion clinics is founded

1990-The House of Commons passes bill C-43, which prohibits abortion unless the physician views the pregnancy as a threat to the woman's physical, mental, or psychological health; It is defeated in a vote by the Senate and abortion is now viewed and treated just as any other normal medical procedure.

Present-Canadian women in the majority of major cities have the right to and access to an abortion. Women living in rural areas are still having issues with access to abortions. Medicare now covers abortions in hospitals, but several provinces still refuse to provide abortion services in clinics.

See also
NARAL Pro-Choice America

References

External links
The Abortion Rights Coalition of Canada website
The Pro-Choice Action Network web site
The Pro-Choice Press issue archive

Abortion-rights organizations in Canada
Organizations established in 1987